Plocamopherus ceylonicus is a species of sea slug, a nudibranch, a shell-less marine gastropod mollusk in the family Polyceridae.

Distribution 
This species was originally described from Sri Lanka.

References

Kelaart, E.F., 1858. Description of a new Ceylonese nudibranch. Annals and Magazine of Natural History, series 3, 1(4): 257-258.

External links 
 SeaSlug Forum info

Polyceridae
Gastropods described in 1858